Matteo Ragonisi (27 February 1660 - 13 April 1734) was an Italian painter of the Baroque period, mainly active in the native town of Acireale in Sicily.

Biography
He painted both portraits and altarpieces in a provincial Baroque style. He is said to have studied in Rome Among the contemporary painters he would have known or worked with in the town were Giacinto Platania, Baldassare Grasso, and Giovanni Lo Coco. He painted an altarpiece depicting Charles Borrromeo before Virgin Mary and Child with Saints Lucy, Rosalia, and Barbara for the church of Santi Pietro e Paolo, Acireale.

References

1660 births
1734 deaths
Painters from Sicily
17th-century Italian painters
18th-century Italian painters
Italian male painters
Italian Baroque painters
18th-century Italian male artists